Ischnocoelia is an Australian genus of potter wasps. The species currently recognised under this genus are:

 Ischnocoelia chlorotica Giordani Soika, 1993
 Ischnocoelia ecclesiastica (Rayment, 1954)
 Ischnocoelia elongate (Saussure, 1856)
 Ischnocoelia exigua Borsato, 2003  
 Ischnocoelia ferruginea (Meade-Waldo, 1910)
 Ischnocoelia fulva (Schulthess, 1910)
 Ischnocoelia gregoryensis Borsato, 2003
 Ischnocoelia integra (Schulthess, 1910)
 Ischnocoelia mirabile Borsato, 2003
 Ischnocoelia occidentalis Giordani Soika, 1969
 Ischnocoelia polychrome Giordani Soika, 1969
 Ischnocoelia robusta (Meade-Waldo, 1910)
 Ischnocoelia somniara Borsato, 2003
 Ischnocoelia xanthochroma Perkins, 1908
 Ischnocoelia yahwulpa Borsato, 2003

References

Potter wasps
Hymenoptera genera
Taxa named by Robert Cyril Layton Perkins